Hesperia woodgatei, the Apache skipper, is a species of grass skipper in the butterfly family Hesperiidae. It is found in Central America and North America.

The MONA or Hodges number for Hesperia woodgatei is 4021.

References

Further reading

 

Hesperiinae
Articles created by Qbugbot